Mary Jane Santa Ana Guck (born October 21, 1964), better known by her stage name Jaclyn Jose, is a Filipino cinema and television actress who has earned international critical acclaim. She is best known for her roles in the films Private Show, White Slavery, and Santa Juana.

Jose's works include Sana ay Ikaw na Nga in 2002 and Te Amo in 2004. Her series Zorro aired on GMA Network. She has starred in the soap operas Babalik Kang Muli and Nagsimula sa Puso.

Jose is also known for her work with actor Juan Rodrigo. She is also known for playing the iconic Magda in the TV and film adaptations of the Primetime Soap Opera Mula Sa Puso and acting in the 1980s films Hati Tayo Sa Magdamag (VIVA Films) and White Slavery (directed by Lino Brocka). Other notable roles include Anne Curtis in Dyosa in 2008 and Ellen Delgado in A Secret Affair in 2012.

In 2016, Jose starred in Brillante Mendoza's Ma' Rosa, for which she won the Cannes Film Festival Award for Best Actress. Jose was the first Southeast Asian to win the award.

As of 2022, Jose is exclusively signed actor of Sparkle, management arm of GMA Network.

Career

1995–2000: Early work
Jose made her debut television appearance on ABS-CBN. She played Esther Lagrimas in the hit series Familia Zaragoza from 1995 to 1996. From 1997 to 1999, Jose played the role of Magda in the original 1997 series Mula Sa Puso, before making her first appearance on Maalaala Mo Kaya. From 1999 to 2000, Jose played Elena Deogracias in the television series Labs Ko Si Babe.

2002–2004: Network switch
After two years of no activity in the TV business, Jose transferred to ABS-CBN's rival network, GMA Network. Her first role was playing Marianna Peron on the popular TV series Sana Ay Ikaw Na Nga. In early 2004, Jose played a recurring role as Carol in Te Amo, Maging Sino Ka Man with her co-star from Mula Sa Puso, Princess Punzalan. Later in 2004, she returned to ABS-CBN to act in an episode of Maalaala Mo Kaya.

2004–2009: Return to ABS-CBN
In 2004, Jose returned to her home network, ABS-CBN.

Jose's first role as a major character was during the last quarter of 2004–2005, when she played Isabella in the television series Hiram.

Jose played a supporting role in SCQ Reload: Ok Ako! as Helen Roxas.

In 2005, she played another supporting role, Elena Cruz, in the popular TV series Ikaw ang Lahat sa Akin.

She played Celeste Cristi in the TV series Komiks Presents: Agua Bendita in 2006, co-starring alongside Shaina Magdayao, Rayver Cruz, and Ramon Bagatsing.

Jose's next main role was playing Darlyn Fernandez in the 2007 show Sineserye Presents: May Minamahal.

Later in 2007, she made her debut appearance in the fantasy anthology TV series Love Spell. In 2007/2008 Jose played the main role of Virgie Burgos in the show Prinsesa ng Banyera.

In 2008–2009, Jose played her first antagonist role in the TV series Dyosa, playing the character Mariang Magayon.

2009–2010: GMA Network and TV5
Later in 2009, Jose returned to GMA Network to play a main character in the Filipino series Zorro, the role of Doña Chiquita Pelaez. This was her last appearance on GMA Network until 2013.

Jose then returned to ABS-CBN to guest star in an episode of Your Song in 2009. In the latter part of 2009–2010, Jose was cast as Minda Fernandez, an antagonist in the show Nagsimula sa Puso.

In 2010, Jose was cast in her third antagonist role, playing Astrud Quijano Crisanto in the series Kung Tayo'y Magkakalayo, or "The Villain and Killer Influence."

Later in 2010, she made her first appearance on TV5 when she guest starred on the show Star Confessions: Congratulations: The April Gustilo Confession. This episode marked her debut appearance on the network.

2011–2013: More projects and Valiente
In 2011, Jose appeared as a guest star in an episode of Your Song, playing Delfina. She also became part of the cast of Sabel, where she had the role of Bettina Zaragoza.

She later was a guest star on the anthology series Maalaala Mo Kaya and the fantasy series Wansapanataym. For her final project in 2011, Jose was a guest in another episode of Maalaala Mo Kaya.

Jose played a supporting role of Luisa Alcantara-Delos Santos, Agnes's mother, in the series Reputasyon, acting alongside starring actress Cristine Reyes from 2011 to 2012.

Jose made her second appearance on TV5 in the 2012 remake of the popular '90s series Valiente. She played Doña Trinidad Braganza, the main antagonist of the series. The role was originally played by Odette Kahn.

In the latter part of 2012, Jose returned to ABS-CBN to guest star in an episode of Maalaala Mo Kaya. From 2012 to 2013, she played a supporting role in Kahit Puso'y Masugatan as Esther Espiritu. This role marked her final appearance on ABS-CBN before transferring networks in the latter part of 2013.

2013–2014: Transfer to GMA Network
For her first project on the Kapuso network, Jose played the role of Doña Charito Vda de Carbonel in the popular 2013 series Mundo Mo'y Akin.

Jose made a guest appearance on the TV series, My Husband's Lover as Doña Charito Vda de Carbonel, Elaine's snobbish friend, a crossover character from Mundo Mo'y Akin. She also guest starred in Bubble Gang as herself, Doña Charito, and Auntie Patty.

In 2013, she made her first guest appearance on The Ryzza Mae Show. Later that year she played the crossover character Doña Charito in the TV series Vampire Ang Daddy Ko. She would later reappear as a different character, the main antagonist of the series.

Later in 2013, Jose guest starred on two episodes of the drama anthology Magpakailanman. She then played Manang Gilda, a recurring character in the series Akin Pa Rin ang Bukas. Jose acted in another episode of Magpakailanman in the same year. She then joined the cast of More Than Words, playing the role of Precy Balmores. Her final role in 2013 was as Agnes Toledo in Genesis.

In 2014, she acted in the series Carmela: Ang Pinakamagandang Babae sa Mundong Ibabaw, portraying Patricia "Trixie" Flores, the main antagonist of the show. Jose then joined the cast of Vampire ang Daddy Ko as Elyvra, the main antagonist of the series. Later that year, she acted in another episode of Magpakailanman and played another antagonist role as Conchita Monteverde in Ilustrado.

2014–2015: More prominent roles and GMA News TV
In late 2014, Jose made her debut appearance in GMA Network's GMA News TV (now GTV as of February 22, 2021) when she acted in an episode of Wagas. She played the role of veteran real-life actress Ms. Boots Anson-Roa. She also appeared in another episode of Magpakailanman.

Jose started in 2015 by guest starring on an episode of Magpakailanman. After that, she guest starred as Marissa on the Eat Bulaga: Lenten Special. In the years 2015 and 2016, Jose joined the cast of Marimar as the new version of Señora Angelika Santibañez, the main antagonist of the series, who was originally played by Katrina Halili.

She also played an extended role in the show Juan Tamad from 2015 to 2016.

2016–present: Recent roles
In 2016, Jose was cast in an antagonist role, playing Stella Montecillo in the afternoon prime series The Millionaire's Wife. She then acted in an episode of Dear Uge. She briefly starred in Season 1 of Alyas Robin Hood as Judy de Jesus, the mother of the lead role, played by Dingdong Dantes.

Her life story was featured in the documentary series, Tunay na Buhay.

Jose starred for the first time in the series A1 Ko Sa 'Yo. She played Digna Molina, the main character of the show. The series aired after her win as Cannes' Best Actress Award. Later in 2016, Jose guest starred on another episode of Wagas on GMA News TV.

In 2017, she starred in her second lead series as Josie Magpayo in D' Originals with LJ Reyes and Kim Domingo. Later in 2017, several months after D' Originals, she played Judy de Jesus again in Season 2 of Alyas Robin Hood.

Filmography

Film

Television

Footnotes

Awards and nominations

Note 
 Shared with Pilar Pilapil for Napakasakit Kuya Eddie.

References

External links 
 

1964 births
Living people
Filipino film actresses
Filipino television actresses
Filipino people of American descent
Filipino people of German descent
People from Angeles City
Actresses from Pampanga
GMA Network personalities
ABS-CBN personalities
Members of Iglesia ni Cristo
Filipino women comedians
20th-century Filipino actresses
21st-century Filipino actresses
Cannes Film Festival Award for Best Actress winners